The Sidi Arif Mosque (also known as Masjid Al-Arif Bellah, ; transliterated: Masjid al-Aarif bi Allah) is one of the largest mosques in Sohag Governorate. It was built for the first time at the 14th century and was reconstructed several times; the last one was in 1968 and being renewed in 1998 for the last time. At the corners of the facade are two minarets, and the roof is crowned by a dome. Inside the five-naves mosque the bases of the piers and the walls were lined with red granite. The ceiling is painted ornamentally; in its middle is an elongated light dome. The southeastern half is lit by chandeliers. At the end there is a prayer niche (mihrab) with simple ornaments and to the right of it the wooden pulpit (minbar). A Mamluk prince's cemetery is situated inside the mosque next to the cemetery of the famous Murad Bey, who fled from Cairo after the Cairo Citadel genocide in the beginning of Muhammad Ali of Egypt era to settle down in Mamluk-controlled area of Jirja (now Sohag).
The real name of the Arif bellah who the mosque was named after him is still mysterious to know because the term ‘arif was used by Sufi authors like Abu Abd al–Rahman al–Sulami (d. 1021) to mean "a gnostic, mystic; a seeker of marifa (spiritual knowledge)", similar in meaning to the terms salik, zahid, faqir, etc.
The mosque is situated in the southern side of the city of Sohag near the main railway station and it is in the entrance of the famous old market(Souq) of Sohag, The Souk El-Qisareya .

Tourism 
Every year the people of Sohag and also a big number of the people of Upper Egypt celebrate the birth day Mulid of El-Arif, and come visit Sohag in large numbers to visit the cemetery of El-Arif inside the mosque.

Gallery

See also
 Lists of mosques
 List of mosques in Africa
 List of mosques in Egypt

References 

14th-century mosques
Mosques completed in 1968
Mosques in Egypt
Mamluk architecture in Egypt
Mosque buildings with domes
Buildings and structures in Sohag Governorate
20th-century religious buildings and structures in Egypt